Floyd Dale, shown on federal maps as Floydale, is an unincorporated community and census-designated place (CDP) in Dillon County, South Carolina, United States. It was first listed as a CDP in the 2020 census with a population of 421.

Near Floyd Dale, there is the Diversified Communications Tower, a guyed mast, which is one of the tallest constructions in the world. This town is home to the Benton family, for whom the main road is named.

The Meekins Barn and Smith Tobacco Barn are listed on the U.S. National Register of Historic Places.

Demographics

2020 census

Note: the US Census treats Hispanic/Latino as an ethnic category. This table excludes Latinos from the racial categories and assigns them to a separate category. Hispanics/Latinos can be of any race.

References 

Unincorporated communities in Dillon County, South Carolina
Unincorporated communities in South Carolina
Census-designated places in Dillon County, South Carolina
Census-designated places in South Carolina